The Romanian Orthodox Episcopate of America is one of three ethnic dioceses of the Orthodox Church in America (OCA), and a former diocese of the Romanian Orthodox Church. The diocesan center is located in Grass Lake, Michigan.

Its territory includes parishes, monasteries, and missions located in 26 states in the United States, as well as six provinces in Canada – Alberta, Arizona, British Columbia, California, Colorado, Connecticut, Florida, Georgia, Illinois, Indiana, Louisiana, Manitoba, Maryland, Massachusetts, Michigan, Minnesota, Missouri, New Hampshire, New Mexico, Nevada, New York, Ohio, Ontario, Oregon, Pennsylvania, Quebec, Rhode Island, Saskatchewan, Tennessee, Texas, Virginia, and Washington.

The current bishop of Detroit and the Romanian Episcopate is Nathaniel Popp. He was consecrated as Bishop of Dearborn Heights and Auxiliary Bishop of the Romanian Episcopate on November 15, 1980. Bishop Nathaniel was enthroned as the ruling hierarch of the diocese on November 17, 1984, following the retirement of Archbishop Valerian (Trifa).  He was elevated to the rank of archbishop on October 20, 1999.

Deaneries
The diocese is grouped geographically into seven deaneries, each consisting of a number of parishes. Each deanery is headed by a parish priest, known as a dean. The deans coordinate activities in their area's parishes, and report to the diocesan bishop.  The current deaneries of the Romanian Episcopate are:

 Atlantic Deanery
 Deanery of Canada
 Michigan Deanery
 Mid-West Deanery
 Ohio and Western Pennsylvania Deanery
 Pacific Deanery
 Southern Deanery

External links
 OrthodoxWiki article
 Official site

Romanian
Eastern Orthodox dioceses in Canada
Eastern Orthodoxy in the United States
Romanian-American history
Romanian-Canadian history
Eastern Orthodoxy in Ohio